Lido is the debut album by Clearlake. It was released in March 2001 on Domino Records. The album's singles were "Winterlight", "Don't Let the Cold In", "Something to Look Forward To" and "Let Go".

Cover 
The front cover features the Saltdean Lido, situated in the band's hometown of Brighton and Hove.

Track listing

References

2001 debut albums
Clearlake (band) albums
Domino Recording Company albums